This is a list of sultans of the Seljuk Empire (1037–1194). 

For a list of rulers of the Seljuk Sultanate of Rum, see List of Seljuk sultans of Rûm.

List of sultans

See also
List of kings of Persia

References

Seljuk Empire
Sultans list
Medieval Islamic world-related lists